The Battle of Berbera (January 10–11, 1827) was an engagement of the Royal Navy and East India Company against the Habr Awal clan. It was the culmination of previous British punitive expeditions against the Habr Awal.

Background
When a British vessel named the Mary Anne attempted to dock in Berbera's port in 1825 it was attacked and multiple members of the crew were massacred by the Habr Awal. In response the Royal Navy enforced a blockade and some accounts narrate an immediate bombardment of the city. Berbera was one of the premier ports of the Gulf of Aden and did significant trade with the Harar in the interior and merchants from across the western Indian Ocean would come trade at the town. The blockade would last until 1827 when a Royal Navy expedition led by Captain W.C Jervoise was sent to Berbera.

British Arrival
The British expedition was a squadron of two Conway class corvettes and one sloop with HMS Tamar, HMS Pandora and HMS Amherst involved. HMS Tamar and HMS Pandora belonged to the Royal Navy and HMS Amherst was a ship of the East India Company. After departing from Mocha, Yemen HMS Tamar and HMS Pandora were joined by  HMS Amherst and would arrive in Berbera on the 10th of January and opened fire on a number of Somali buggalows in the harbour with all escaping unharmed. After this initial bombardment Captain James Gordon Bremer sent a delegation on shore led by Lieutenant John Downey to the Sheikhs of the Habr Awal and expressed his desire to speak to them regarding the 1825 attack on the Mary Anne, in which they agreed to meet the following morning.

Battle
On the night of January 10 Captain Bremer had sounded the harbour and concluded that it was excellent and the squadron would move in and weigh anchor in the bay of Berbera the following morning. Upon the approach of the British ships into the bay the Habr Awal set fire to the city and began to plunder the goods of the visiting Banyan merchants who were British subjects. In response the squadron opened fire deliberately aiming above the crowds in order to intimidate rather than kill them. Under Captain Jervoise of HMS Pandora a contingent of 250 Royal Marines & Sepoys were deployed from HMS Amherst and landed. They faced up to 2,000-2,500 Somalis who quickly dispersed in the face of their well armed opponents. In the ensuing chaos Captain Jervoise moved to occupy the centre of Berbera on a ridge and a division led by Lieutenant Jeffrey Noble was attacked with one Royal Marine dying and several other losses being incurred. The ships ceased their bombardment after Jervoise's capture and the fires were gradually put out. The Somalis would surrender in small parties and eventually negotiations would restart.

Aftermath

Following the battle the Sheikhs of the Habr Awal requested several days to gather other notables who were several days away from Berbera before an agreement could be concluded. The British initially insisted on 30,000 Spanish Dollars but upon the Sheikhs stating the fires in Berbera had cost the Habr Awal a significant amount of losses, agreed on an indemnity of 15,000 dollars to be paid in over three years in installments. The treaty settled the 1825 attack on the Mary Anne and gave the British the ability to trade safely in Berbera, and all ships flying the Union Jack would be afforded the same rights.

Letter to Saqr Al Qassimi

The Isaaq Sultan Farah Guled and Haji Ali penned a letter to Sultan bin Saqr Al Qasimi of Ras Al Khaimah in the 1830s requesting military assistance and joint religious war against the British. Alongside their stronghold in the Persian Gulf & Gulf of Oman the Qasimi were very active both militarily and economically in the Gulf of Aden and were given to plunder and attack ships as far west as the Mocha on the Red Sea. They had numerous commercial ties with the Somalis, leading vessels from Ras Al Khaimah and the Persian Gulf to regularly attend trade fairs in the large ports of Berbera and Zeila and were very familiar with the Isaaq.

See also
Royal Navy
Berbera
Habr Awal
Isaaq Sultanate

References

Naval battles involving the United Kingdom
Conflicts in 1827
Battles involving the United Kingdom
History of Somaliland
January 1827 events
Battles involving the British East India Company
Royal Marines